Alexa is a female form of Alex.  It is variously a given name in its own right or a short form of Alexandra, both of which come from the Greek name Alexandros.  It can be broken down into alexo meaning "to defend" and ander meaning "man", making Alexa mean "defender" and Alexandra "defender of man". The similarly-spelled name Aleksa is a South Slavic masculine name.

Modern popularity 

In the United States, the name Alexa first appeared on the chart of the top 1,000 most popular baby girl names in the year 1973. It stayed in the lower ranks of the top 1000 until 1986 when it jumped from number 815 to number 431. Popularity continued to climb and Alexa was ranked in the top 100 in the mid-1990s. According to the Social Security Administration, its highest popularity, 39th, was achieved in 2006. The name's popularity decreased rapidly after Amazon picked it as the wake word of its voice service Amazon Alexa, which was released worldwide in 2016.

Notable people with the name

Given name
Alexa Alemanni, American actress
Alexa Chung (born 1983), British TV presenter
Alexa Curtis (singer) (born 2004), Australian singer, winner of The Voice Kids Australia
Alexa Curtis (entrepreneur), American entrepreneur and writer
Alexa Davalos (born 1982), French-American actress
Alexa Davies (born 1995), British actress
Alexa Dectis (born 1993), American actress
Alexa Demara (born 1989), American actress
Alexa Demie (born 1990), American actress
Alexa Fairchild (born 1994), Belgian equestrian athlete 
Alexa Glatch (born 1989), American tennis player
Alexa Goddard (born 1988), British singer
Alexa Hampton (born 1971), American entrepreneur
Alexa Havins (born 1980), American actress
Alexa Hepburn, Reader in Conversation Analysis in the Social Sciences Department at Loughborough University
Alexa Hirschfeld (born 1985), American entrepreneur
Alexa Hunt (born 1942), American author
Alexa Ilacad (born 2000), Filipina actress
Alexa Ray Joel (born 1985), singer-songwriter and daughter of Billy Joel
Alexa Junge, American screenwriter
Alexa Kenin (1962–1985), American actress
Alexa Komarnycky (born 1989), Canadian swimmer
Alexa Loo (born 1972), Canadian snowboarder
Alexa McDonough (born 1944), Canadian politician
Alexa Moreno (born 1994), Mexican artistic gymnast
Alexa Nikolas (born 1992), American actress
Alexa von Porembsky (1906–1981), German actor
Alexa Sand, American art history professor
Alexa Scimeca (born 1991), American pair skater
Alexa Still, Australian musician
Alexa Stirling (1897-1977), American golf player
Alexa Suelzer (born 1918), American author
Alexa Vega (born 1988), Colombian American actress
Alexa Viscius, American multi-disciplinary artist
Alexa Von Tobel (born 1984), founder and CEO of LearnVest.com
Alexa Weber Morales, American Grammy award-winning singer-songwriter, editor
 Alexa Wilkinson, American singer and musician
Alexa Woodward, American indie/folk singer and songwriter

Fictional
Alexa Bliss, ring name of professional wrestler Alexis Kaufman (born 1991)
Alexa Lexington from MySims, MySims Kingdom, and MySims Agents
Alexa Pappadopoulos, a character from the Degrassi teen drama franchise.
Alexa, one of the characters from the Diva Starz toy line
Alexa Rivera, also known as Fuerza, character in The Flash
Alexa Smith, character in EastEnders
Alexa Woods, character in Alien vs. Predator

Surname
Dan Alexa (born 1979), Romanian footballer
Kate Alexa (born 1988), Australian singer
AleXa (born 1996), South Korean American singer

References 

 thinkbabynames.com on Alexa
 WikiName on Alexa

Feminine given names
English feminine given names
Filipino feminine given names